Canoe Creek is a creek flowing generally west in a zig zag course into the Fraser River in the Cariboo region of British Columbia, Canada, joining that river south of Gang Ranch.

Name
His crew of voyageurs named the location Le Canot.

Related placenames
Canoe Creek is the namesake of three of the Indian reserves of the Canoe Creek Band/Dog Creek Indian Band:
Canoe Creek Indian Reserve No. 1
Canoe Creek Indian Reserve No. 2
Canoe Creek Indian Reserve No. 3

See also

Canoe Creek (disambiguation)

References

Rivers of the Cariboo
Tributaries of the Fraser River
Fraser Canyon
Lillooet Land District